Iris Wildthyme is a series of audio plays from Big Finish Productions, featuring Katy Manning as Iris Wildthyme, a character from the spin-off media based on the long-running British science fiction television series Doctor Who.

Episodes

Series 1 (2005)
Featuring Ortis Deley as Tom and David Benson as Panda. Artwork for both releases in Series 1 was by Stuart Manning.

Series 2 (2009)
Featuring David Benson as Panda. Each individual release parodied Doctor Who from one decade between the 1960s and the 1990s.

Special (2009)
Featuring David Benson as Panda.

Series 3 (2012)
Appearing in "Midwinter Murders", Stewart Bevan had previously appeared with Katy Manning in the Doctor Who story, The Green Death, playing Jo Grant's future husband.

Series 4 (2013)
Featuring David Benson as Panda.

Wildthyme Reloaded (2015)

Iris Wildthyme and Friends

References

External links
Wildthyme at Large at Big Finish Productions
The Devil in Ms Wildthyme at Big Finish Productions

Audio plays based on Doctor Who
Big Finish Productions
Doctor Who spin-offs
Iris Wildthyme audio plays